Richard F. America Jr is an American economist who is Emeritus Professor of the Practice in the McDonough School of Business of Georgetown University. He was among the founders of the National Economic Association, and served as the Association's president in 1985. He was previously the Associate Director of Urban Programs at the University of California's Haas School of Business, a lecturer at Stanford Business School, and a Senior Program Manager in the U,S. Small Business Administration.

America was among the first economists to advocate for reparations to Black Americans.

Selected works 

 America, Richard F., ed. The wealth of races: The present value of benefits from past injustices. No. 132. Praeger, 1990.
 America, Richard F., and Bernard E. Anderson Moving ahead: Black managers in American business. McGraw-Hill, 1978.
 America, Richard F., ed. Philanthropy and economic development. United Nations Publications, 1995.
 America, Richard F. Paying the Social Debt: What White America Owes Black America. ABC-CLIO, 1993.
 America Jr, Richard F. "What Do You People Want?." Harvard Business Review 47, no. 2 (1969): 103–112.

References 

Living people
21st-century American economists
African-American economists
Harvard Business School alumni
Year of birth missing (living people)
21st-century African-American people
Presidents of the National Economic Association
Economists from Pennsylvania
Educators from Philadelphia
Georgetown University faculty